Westhausen is a village and a former municipality in the district of Gotha, in Thuringia, Germany. Since 1 January 2019, it is part of the municipality Nessetal.

References

Former municipalities in Thuringia
Gotha (district)
Saxe-Coburg and Gotha